Yanacocha (possibly from in the Quechua spelling Yanaqucha; yana black, very dark, qucha lake, "black lake") is a lake in the Cordillera Blanca in the Andes of  Peru located in the Ancash Region, Asunción Province, Chacas District.

See also 
 Copap

References 

Lakes of Peru
Lakes of Ancash Region